Rhine Castle trail - Rheinburgenweg (previously: Rheinburgen-Wanderweg), follows the left side of the Rhine from Bingen to Remagen-Rolandseck and the right side takes the route of the Rheinsteig from Rüdesheim am Rhein to Koblenz.

Route and sights of interest 
Rüdesheim am Rhein
Boosenburg
Brömserburg
Ehrenfels Castle (Hesse)
Assmannshausen
Lorch am Rhein
Nollig Castle
Pfalzgrafenstein Castle
Gutenfels Castle
Lorelei
Katz Castle
Maus Castle
Marksburg
Lahneck Castle
Ehrenbreitstein Fortress
Koblenz
Kurfürstliche Residenz
Stolzenfels Castle
Königsstuhl von Rhens
Klostergut Jokobsberg
Burg Boppard
Rheinfels Castle
Schönburg (Rhine)
Stahleck Castle
Fürstenberg Castle (Rheindiebach)
Heimburg in Niederheimbach
Sooneck Castle
Reichenstein Castle (Trechtingshausen)
Rheinstein Castle
Mouse Tower
Klopp Castle
Bingen am Rhein

External links

official website
loreley-info
Rheinburgenweg from Remagen to Bingen in winter (de)

Hiking trails in Rhineland-Palatinate
Middle Rhine